Klučov is name of several locations in the Czech Republic:
Klučov (Kolín District)
Klučov (Třebíč District)